Cloud Boy is a children's picture book written and illustrated by creator Rhode Montijo and published by Simon & Schuster Children's Publishing in 2006.

Plot
A lonely cloud boy lives up high in the sky. One day, a butterfly passes by and its beauty gives him a great idea. He soon fashions a butterfly from a fluffy cloud nearby and sends it adrift in the air so that others may see his beautiful creation. Soon Cloud Boy looks down at the earth, seeing even more beautiful and wonderful things. He begins to fashion more clouds in the shapes of what he sees, things like boats, rabbits, and snowmen. Soon, many of the children on the earth see his designs and take great delight in them. It is then that Cloud Boy learns he will never be lonely again as long as there are children below the sky who enjoy his artistic creations.

Reception
Reviews of Cloud Boy have been mixed.  Kirkus Reviews wrote "comic artist Montijo explores the artistic impulse in a brief episode that’s as insubstantial as the clouds he depicts." and concluded "This debut may have some resonance for older budding artists, but for younger audiences it offers no competition to Charles G. Shaw’s ageless It Looked Like Spilt Milk (1947)."  while Publishers Weekly stated "Montijo creates a crisply defined yet soothing visual universe" and "While adults can read the story as an allegory of the artistic ideal, children will appreciate it just for its collection of benevolent floating creations. The hero resembles an airborne cumulus balloon-maker."

References

American picture books
Children's fiction books
2006 children's books